
AD 60 (LX) was a leap year starting on Tuesday (link will display the full calendar) of the Julian calendar. At the time, it was known as the Year of the Consulship of Nero and Lentulus (or, less frequently, year 813 Ab urbe condita). The denomination AD 60 for this year has been used since the early medieval period, when the Anno Domini calendar era became the prevalent method in Europe for naming years.

The year 60 is the first identifiable year for which a date is cited complete with day of the week, i.e. 6 February 60, identified as a "Sunday" (as viii idus Februarius dies solis "eighth day before the ides of February, day of the Sun") in a Pompeiian graffito. According to the currently-used Julian calendar, 6 February 60 was a Wednesday (dies Mercurii, "day of Mercury").  This is explained by the existence of two conventions of naming days of the weeks based on the planetary hours system, 6 February was a "Sunday" based on the sunset naming convention, and a "Wednesday" based on the sunrise naming convention.

Events

By place

Roman Empire 
 The Roxolani are defeated on the Danube by the Romans.
 Emperor Nero sends an expedition to explore the historical city Meroë (Sudan).
 Vitellius is (possibly) proconsul of the province of Africa.
 Agrippa II of the Herodians rules the northeast of Judea.
 The following events in Roman Britain (Britannia) take place in AD 60 or 61:
 Gaius Suetonius Paulinus, Roman governor of Britain, captures the island of Mona (Anglesey), the last stronghold of the Druids.
 Prasutagus, king of the Iceni (modern East Anglia), dies leaving a will which passes his kingdom to his two daughters and the Roman Empire. The Roman army, however, annexes the kingdom as if conquered, depriving the nobles of their hereditary lands and plundering the land. The king's widow, Boudica, is flogged and forced to watch their daughters publicly raped. Roman financiers, including Seneca the Younger, call in their loans.
 Boudica leads a rebellion of the Iceni against Roman rule in alliance with the Trinovantes, Cornovii, Durotriges and Celtic Britons. The Iceni and Trinovantes first destroy the Roman capital Camulodunum (Colchester), wipe out the infantry of the Legio IX Hispana (commanded by Quintus Petillius Cerialis) and go on to burn Londinium (London) (probably destroying London Bridge) and Verulamium (St Albans), in all cases massacring the inhabitants by the thousands.
 Paulinus defeats the rebels at the Battle of Watling Street using a flying wedge formation, imposes wide-ranging punishments on native Britons, and the Romanization of Britain continues. Boudica either poisons herself or falls sick and dies.

By topic

Religion 
 The First Epistle of Peter, if by Peter, is probably written between this year and c. AD 64.
 Paul of Tarsus journeys to Rome, but is shipwrecked on Malta. He stays for three months and converts Publius, the first bishop of Malta. Pau
 Paul writes his epistle to the Philippians from Rome. (approximate date)

Art and science 
 Hero of Alexandria writes Metrica, Mechanics, and Pneumatics.
 AD 60–79 – House of the Vettii, Pompeii, is rebuilt.

Births 
 Buddhamitra, Indian Buddhist nun (approximate date)
 Marcus Vitorius Marcellus, Roman politician (approximate date)
 Nicomachus, Greek mathematician (approximate date)

Deaths 
 Abdagases I, king of the Parthian Empire (approximate date)
 Boudica, British queen of the Iceni tribe (approximate date)
 Peter of Rates, first bishop of Braga (approximate date)

References 

0060

als:60er#60